The 2005 Tim Hortons Brier, the Canadian men's curling championship, was held at Rexall Place in Edmonton, Alberta from March 5 to 13. The tournament consisted of 12 teams, one from each province, plus a team representing the Yukon and Northwest Territories, plus a team representing Northern Ontario. The defending champion, Mark Dacey, did not participate, as he was knocked out in the Nova Scotia final by Shawn Adams' team. The tournament featured 3-time Brier champion (2001, 2002, 2003) Randy Ferbey of Alberta, 1998 Champion Wayne Middaugh of Ontario, 2003 and 2004 Newfoundland and Labrador champion Brad Gushue, 2000 and 2002 Nova Scotia champion Shawn Adams, 1992 and 2001 Yukon/Northwest Territories champion skip Steve Moss, 1986 New Brunswick champion Wade Blanchard, 2002 and 2003 British Columbia champion (third and second respectively for Pat Ryan), Deane Horning, 1981 and 1996 Prince Edward Island champion lead for Peter MacDonald, Rod MacDonald; 2003 Quebec champion second for Guy Hemmings, Jean-Michel Ménard as well as three new teams: Randy Dutiaume of Manitoba, Mike Jakubo of Northern Ontario and Pat Simmons of Saskatchewan.

The event was a success, with the total attendance of 281,985 setting a Brier record. In the end, the home town team of Randy Ferbey and company won. This was the fourth win in 5 years for the team in their fifth final appearance in a row. They would set a record for the most Brier wins as a complete team. The final, against Shawn Adams' Nova Scotia rink, marked the third year in a row Nova Scotia and Alberta met in the final.

Teams

Round-robin standings
Final round-robin standings

Round-robin results
All draw times are listed in Eastern Standard Time (UTC−5).

Draw 1
Saturday, March 5, 16:00

Draw 2
Saturday, March 5, 20:30

Draw 3
Sunday, March 6, 11:30

Draw 4
Sunday, March 6, 16:00

Draw 5
Sunday, March 6, 20:30

Draw 6
Monday, March 7, 11:30

Draw 7
Monday, March 7, 16:00

Draw 8
Monday, March 7, 20:30

Draw 9
Tuesday, March 8, 11:30

Draw 10
Tuesday, March 8, 16:00

Draw 11
Tuesday, March 8, 20:30

Draw 12
Wednesday, March 9, 11:30

Draw 13
Wednesday, March 9, 16:00

Draw 14
Wednesday, March 9, 20:30

Draw 15
Thursday, March 10, 11:30

Draw 16
Thursday, March 10, 16:00

Draw 17
Thursday, March 10, 20:30

Playoffs
The Tim Hortons Brier uses the page playoff system where the top four teams with the best records at the end of round-robin play meet in the playoff rounds. The first and second place teams play each other, with the winner advancing directly to the final. The winner of the other page playoff game between the third and fourth place teams plays the loser of the first/second playoff game in the semi-final. The winner of the semi-final moves on to the final.

1 vs. 2 game
Friday, March 11, 20:30

Alberta advanced to the 2005 Brier Final with a 7-4 win over Manitoba. The 7th end proved to be pivotal, as Alberta stole it to take a 5-3 lead. Manitoba played Nova Scotia in the semifinal.

3 vs. 4 game
Friday, March 11, 13:00

Nova Scotia eliminated Quebec, giving them a berth in the semifinal. Nova Scotia skip Shawn Adams clinched the game with a draw to the 4-foot to beat two Quebec stones on his last shot of the 10th end.

Semifinal
Saturday, March 12, 14:00

A mistake by Manitoba's Randy Dutiaume on his final shot in the third end allowed Shawn Adams' Nova Scotia rink to pick up 4 points, and they never looked back despite a late come-back by Manitoba. Nova Scotia would advance to the 2005 Brier Final.

Final
Sunday, March 13, 19:00

Nova Scotia and Alberta would meet in the Brier Final for the third year in a row, except this time with a different Nova Scotia team. Ferbey and his Alberta foursome were making their fifth straight final appearance. In a close game, Alberta's questionable calls proved to be anything but costly. In the 9th end, Alberta's fourth David Nedohin on his first shot took out his own rock which would end up forcing a blank to keep hammer in the 10th. In the 10th end, Nedohin made another controversial shot, drawing to the 4-foot instead of peeling the corner guard. This forced Nova Scotia's Shawn Adams to make a difficult draw to keep hope alive. Adams' shot sat at the back of the 4-foot, and all Nedohin had to do to win was draw again for the win, which he did. It was their fourth Brier win in the last 5 years.

Awards
 Tournament Most Valuable Player:  David Nedohin, Alberta

First All-Star team
 Lead:  Marcel Rocque, Alberta
 Second:  Scott Pfeifer, Alberta
 Third:  Randy Ferbey, Alberta
 Fourth:  David Nedohin, Alberta

Second All-Star team
 Lead:  Kelly Mittelstadt, Nova Scotia
 Second:  Greg Melnichuk, Manitoba
 Third:  Paul Flemming, Nova Scotia
 Skip:  Shawn Adams, Nova Scotia

Statistics

Top 5 player percentages
Round Robin only, minimum 8 games

Provincial playdowns
Defending provincial champions indicated in bold.

Alberta
@ the Innisfail Arena in Innisfail. Randy Ferbey defeated Jamie King 8-6 in the finals on February 13.  Standings

Pool A
 Randy Ferbey, Granite CC, Edmonton (5-0) (won "A1-B1" game; won final)
 Mark Johnson, Saville Centre, Edmonton (4-1) (lost "A2-B3" game)
 Terry Meek, Calgary CC (3-2) (lost "B2-A3" game)
 Kurt Balderston, Sexsmith CC (2-3)
 John Climenhaga, Saville Centre, Edmonton (1-4)
 James Knievel, Manning CC (0-5)
Pool B
 Jamie King, Saville Centre, Edmonton (5-0) (lost "A1-B1" game; won-semi-final; lost final)
 Rob Armitage, Red Deer CC (3-2) (won "A2-B3" game; won quarter-final; lost semi-final)
 John Morris, Innisfail CC (4-1) (won "B2-A3" game; lost quarter-final)
 Dean Davidson, Vermilion CC (2-3)
 Frank Morissette, Calgary CC (1-4)
 Adrian Bakker, Calgary Winter Club (0-5)

British Columbia
@ the Smithers Curling Club in Smithers. Deane Horning defeated Bob Ursel 7-5 in the finals on February 6.  Standings
 Deane Horning, Trail CC (5-2) (won semi-final, won final)
 Bob Ursel, Kelowna CC (6-1) (lost final)
 Greg McAulay, Richmond CC (5-2) (lost semi-final)
 Brent Pierce, Royal City CC, New Westminster (4-3)
 Bert Gretzinger, Kelowna CC (3-4)
 Wes Craig, Kerry Park CC, Mill Bay (2-5)
 Dean Joanisse, Victoria CC (2-5)
 Tom Buchy, Kimberley (1-6)

Jay Peachey, the defending champion did not qualify

Manitoba
@ the Selkirk Memorial Arena in Selkirk. Randy Dutiaume defeated Ryan Fry 8-5 in the finals on February 13.  Standings (Double knock-out format until championship round)
 Randy Dutiaume, Valour Road CC, Winnipeg (7-1)
 Ryan Fry, St. Vital CC, Winnipeg (7-3)
 Kerry Burtnyk, Assiniboine Memorial CC, Winnipeg (6-2)
 Jeff Stoughton, Charleswood CC, Winnipeg (5-2)
 Brent Scales, Swan River CC (4-2)
 Peter Nicholls, Elmwood CC, Winnipeg (4-2)
 Kelly Robertson, Neepawa CC (4-3)
 Terry McNamee, Brandon CC (3-3)
 Chris Galbraith, Stonewall CC (3-2)
 Don Spriggs, Portage CC, Portage la Prairie (3-2)
 James Kirkness, Ft. Rouge CC, Winnipeg (2-2)
 Blaine Gogal, Flin Flon CC (2-2)
 Doug Riach, St. Vital CC, Winnipeg (2-2)
 Peter Pruden, Petersfield CC (2-2)
 Bob Sigurdson, Granite CC, Winnipeg (2-2)
 Peter Prokopowich, Dauphin CC (1-2)
 Doug Harrison, St. Vital CC, Winnipeg (1-2)
 Brad Wainikka, Morden CC (1-2)
 Dave Boehmer, Grain Ex CC, Winnipeg (1-2)
 Scott Ramsay, Virden CC (1-2)
 Brent Braemer, Assiniboine Memorial CC, Winnipeg (1-2)
 Richard Muntain, St. Vital CC, Winnipeg (1-2)
 Randy Neufeld, LaSalle CC, Sanford (1-2)
 Murray Warren, Deloraine CC (1-2)
 Dave Tibbatts, Binscarth CC (0-2)
 Troy Hamilton, Granite CC, Winnipeg (0-2)
 Kevin Larson, Springfield CC, Dugald (0-2)
 Gerry Janz, Baldur CC (0-2)
 Don Holmes, Flin Flon CC (0-2)
 Doug Gade, Benito CC (0-2)
 Dean Steski, Grain Ex CC, Winnipeg (0-2)
 Rae Hainstock, Thompson CC (0-2)

New Brunswick
@ the Moncton Curling Association in Moncton. Wade Blanchard defeated Russ Howard 9-4 in the finals on February 6.  Standings
 Wade Blanchard, Thistle St. Andrews, Saint John (5-2) (Won Semi-final; won final)
 Russ Howard, Curling Beausejour, Moncton (6-1) (lost final)
 Brian Dobson, Thistle St. Andrews, Saint John (5-2) (lost semi-final)
 Mike Kennedy, Thistle St. Andrews, Saint John (4-3)
 Jim Sullivan, Thistle St. Andrews, Saint John (3-4)
 Trevor Hanson, Capital Winter Club, Fredericton (2-5)
 Wayne Aubie, Bathurst CC (2-5)
 Tim Comeau, Capital Winter Club, Fredericton (1-6)

Newfoundland and Labrador
@ the Corner Brook Recreation Complex in Corner Brook. Brad Gushue defeated Mark Noseworthy 5-4 in the finals on February 6.  Standings
 Brad Gushue, St. John's CC (7-2) (won semi-final, won final)
 Mark Noseworthy, St. John's CC (7-2) (lost final)
 Ken Pedigrew, St. John's CC (6-3) (won tie-breaker; lost semi-final)
 Bas Buckle, Corner Brook CC (6-3) (lost tie-breaker)
 Rick Rowsell, St. John's CC (5-4)
 Gary Oke, Gander CC (5-4)
 Bob Skanes, Gander CC (4-5)
 Bob Dillon, Goose Bay CC, Happy Valley – Goose Bay (3-6)
 Mike Ryan, Carol CC, Labrador City (1-8)
 Tom Byrne, Caribou CC, Stephenville (1-8)

Northern Ontario
@ the Cobalt-Haileybury Curling Club in Haileybury. Mike Jakubo defeated Tim Phillips 8-7 in the final on February 13.  Staindings
 Mike Jakubo, Copper Cliff CC (6-2) (lost "1-2" game, won semi-final, won final)
 Tim Phillips, Sudbury CC (7-1) (won "1-2" game, lost final)
 Bryan Burgess, Fort William CC, Thunder Bay (4-4) (won tie-braker #1, won tie-breaker #2, won quarter-final, lost semi-final)
 John Salo, Port Arthur CC, Thunder Bay (5-3)
 Daryl Rowlandson, Englehart CC (4-4) (lost tie-breker #2)
 Al Harnden, Soo Curlers Association, Sault Ste. Marie (4-4) (lost tie-breaker #1)
 Rob Gordon, Cobalt-Haileybury CC, Haileybury (3-5)
 Dave MacInnes, McIntyre CC, Schumacher (3-5)
 Brent Taylor, Kenora CC (0-8)

Nova Scotia
@ the Bridgewater Curling Club in Bridgewater. Shawn Adams clinched the championship with a 9-6 win over Mark Dacey on February 8.  Standings (triple knock-out)
 Shawn Adams, Mayflower CC, Halifax (7-1)
 Mark Dacey, Mayflower CC, Halifax (6-3)
 Mark Kehoe, Mayflower CC, Halifax (5-3)
 Brian Rafuse, Bridgewater CC (5-3)
 Graham Breckon, Chester CC (4-3)
 Scott Saunders, Mayflower CC, Halifax (4-3)
 Peter Eddy, Mayflower CC, Halifax (3-3)
 Steve Ogden, Mayflower CC, Halifax (3-3)
 Kevin White, Bluenose CC, New Glasgow (3-3)
 Jamie Murphy, Mayflower CC, Halifax (2-3)
 Arnold Burnard, Halifax CC (1-3)
 Don MacIntosh, Truro CC (1-3)
 Doug MacKenzie, Mayflower CC, Halifax (1-3)
 Chad Stevens, Chester CC (1-3)
 Andrew Corkum, Mayflower CC, Halifax (0-3)
 Kevin Ouelette, Lakeshore CC, Lower Sackville (0-3)

Ontario
The 2005 Ontario Kia Cup was held @ the Iroquois Park Sports Centre in Whitby.  Wayne Middaugh defeated Glenn Howard  8-7 in the final on February 13.  Standings
 Wayne Middaugh, St. George's Golf & CC, Etobicoke (8-1) (loses "1-2" game, wins semi-final, wins final)
 Glenn Howard, Coldwater & District CC (7-2) (wins "1-2" game, loses final)
 Peter Corner, Glanford CC, Mount Hope (6-3) (wins quarter-final, loses semi-final)
 Greg Balsdon, Guelph Ctry. Club (6-3) (loses quarter-final)
 Nick Rizzo, Omemee CC (5-4)
 Brian Lewis, Huntley CC, Ottawa (4-5)
 Bryan Cochrane, RCMP CC, Ottawa (4-5)
 Kirk Ziola, Ilderton CC (3-6)
 Josh Adams, Granite CC of West Ottawa (1-8)
 Andrew Fairfull, Guelph CC (1-8)

Mike Harris, the defending champion did not qualify

Prince Edward Island
@ the Maple Leaf Curling Club in O'Leary Rod MacDonald defeated John Likely 7-6 in the final on February 13.  Standings
 Rod MacDonald, Charlottetown CC (5-2) (won final)
 John Likely (4-3), Charlottetown CC (wins tie-breaker, wins semi-final, lost final)
 Robert Shaw (4-3), Silver Fox, Summerside (wins tie-breaker, loses semi-final)
 Kyle Stevenson (4-3), Charlottetown CC (loses tie-breaker)
 Andrew Robinson (4-3), Charlottetown CC (loses tie-breaker)
 Robert Campbell (3-4), Charlottetown CC
 Mark Minney (3-4), Charlottetown CC
 Kevin Ellsworth Western CCC, Alberton (1-6)

Mike Gaudet, the defending champion did not qualify

Quebec
@ the Aréna de Grand-Mère in Shawinigan. Jean-Michel Ménard defeated Robert Desjardins 8-4 in the final on February 13.  Standings
A
 Jean-Michel Ménard, CC Etchemin, Saint-Romuald & CC Victoria, Sainte-Foy (7-0) (won "A1-B1" game, win final)
 Robert Desjardins, CC Chicoutimi / CC Kénogami, Jonquière (5-2) (won quarter-final, won semi-final, lost final)
 Denis Roberge, CC Ethemin, Saint-Romuald (4-3)
 Ted Butler, CC Buckingham (4-3)
 Daniel Lafleur CC Rosemère, Montreal (3-4)
 Karl Dubé, CC Rimouski (2-5)
 Alain Guy, CC Trois-Rivières & CC Laviolette, Trois-Rivières (2-5)
 Joël Valiquette, CC Vallée de l'or, Sullivan (1-6)

B
 Claude Brazeau, Jr., CC Longue-Pointe, Montreal (7-0) (lost "A1-B1" game, lost semi-final)
 Simon Hébert, CC Baie-Comeau & CC Port-Cartier (5-2) (lost quarter-final)
 Guy Hemmings, CC Longue-Pointe, Montreal (4-3)
 Don Westphal, CC Boucherville (4-3)
 Laurent Lapierre, CC Mont-Bruno, Saint-Bruno (3-4)
 Ghislain Thivierge, CC Riverbend, Alma / CC Kénogami, Jonquière (2-5)
 Tom Wharry, CC Windsor (2-5)
 Stéphane Larouche, CC Lacolle (1-6)

Saskatchewan
@ the Melfort Curling Club in Melfort. Pat Simmons defeated Daryl Williamson 7-5 in the final on February 13.  Standings:
 Pat Simmons, Davidson CC (5-3) (wins tie-breaker, wins semi-final, wins final)
 Daryl Williamson, Rocanville CC (5-3) (loses final)
 Joel Jordison, Bushell Park CC, Moose Jaw (5-3) (loses semi-final)
 Dale Craig, Nutana CC, Saskatoon (5-3) (loses tie-breaker)
 Doug Harcourt, Humboldt (4-4)
 Jamie Schneider, Tartan CC, Regina (4-4)
 Brian Humble, Sutherland CC, Saskatoon (3-5)
 Scott Bitz, Caledonian CC, Regina (3-5)
 Steve Laycock, Radisson CC (2-6)

Bruce Korte, the defending champion did not qualify

Yukon/Northwest Territories
@ the Yellowknife Curling Club in Yellowknife, Northwest Territories. Steve Moss clinched the tournament on February 13 with a 6-5 win over Doug Gee.  Standings:
 Steve Moss, Northwest Territories (4-1)
 Peter O'Driscol, Northwest Territories (3-2)
 Chad Cowan, Yukon (3-2)
 Doug Gee, Yukon (0-5)

Brian Wasnea, the defending champion did not qualify

References

2005
Tim Hortons Brier
Curling competitions in Edmonton
2005 in Alberta